Martha Heesen (born 6 May 1948) is a Dutch writer.

Career 

In 2004, she won the Golden Book-Owl for her book Toen Faas niet thuiskwam.

In 2007, she received the Vlag en Wimpel award for the book Wolf.

In 2015, she won the Theo Thijssen-prijs.

Awards 

 2000: Zilveren Griffel, De vloek van Cornelia
 2001: Zilveren Griffel, Mijn zusje is een monster
 2002: Zilveren Griffel,  Stekels 
 2004: Golden Book-Owl, Toen Faas niet thuiskwam
 2007: Vlag en Wimpel, Wolf
 2015: Theo Thijssen-prijs

References

External links 
 Martha Heesen, Digital Library for Dutch Literature

1948 births
Living people
20th-century Dutch women writers
21st-century Dutch women writers
Dutch children's writers
Dutch women children's writers
People from Oisterwijk